The 2009–10 Gonzaga Bulldogs men's basketball team represented Gonzaga University in the 2009–10 NCAA Division I men's basketball season. The Bulldogs are members of the West Coast Conference, were led by head coach Mark Few, and played they home games at the McCarthey Athletic Center on the Gonzaga campus in Spokane, Washington. The Zags finished the season 27–7, 12–2 in WCC play to claim the regular season championship. They advanced to the championship game of the 2010 West Coast Conference men's basketball tournament before falling to Saint Mary's. They received an at–large bid to the 2010 NCAA Division I men's basketball tournament, earning an 8 seed in the West Region. They defeated 9 seed Florida State in the first round before losing to 1 seed and AP #4 Syracuse in the second round.

Preseason

Departures

Incoming transfers

2009 recruiting class

Roster

Rankings

Season

Preconference
Gonzaga opened the season with a 94–53 exhibition victory over Alberta on November 2. Matt Bouldin led the team with 17 points, followed by Sam Dower with 15 points and Robert Sacre with 11 points. Gonzaga led by as many as 26 points in the second half as they earned a 92–74 victory over Mississippi Valley State on November 14. Four Gonzaga players scored in double-figures, including Bouldin with a game-high 22 points, Elias Harris with 18, Steven Gray with 16, and Sacre with 17. On November 17, they played against Michigan State at the Jack Breslin Student Events Center and finished with a 75–71 loss against the second-ranked Spartans. Sacre managed to match his career-high of 17 points, despite playing only 19 minutes in the game. The Zags returned home and finished with a 90–55 victory over IPFW on November 20. Sacre lead Gonzaga with 15 points, 8 rebounds, and 2 blocks.

During Thanksgiving week, Gonzaga participated in the 2009 Maui Invitational Tournament at the Lahaina Civic Center in Lahaina, Hawaii. On November 23, they defeated Colorado 76–72 during the opening round of the tournament. Steven Gray scored a game-high 27 points to help the Zags overcome a bad first half. In the second round of the tournament on November 24, Gonzaga defeated Wisconsin 74–61. Four Gonzaga players scored in double digits, which helped the Zags maintain a double digit lead for most of the second half. On November 25, Gonzaga beat Cincinnati 61–59 to win the Maui Invitational for the first time in school history. Steven Gray lead the Zags with 13 points, 7 rebounds, and 4 assists.

Schedule

|-
!colspan=9| Exhibition Event

|-
!colspan=9| Regular Season

|-
!colspan=9| 2009 EA Sports Maui Invitational

|-
!colspan=9|

|-
!colspan=9| Battle In Seattle

|-
!colspan=9| Aeropostle Classic

|-
!colspan=9|

|-
!colspan=9| Ronald McDonald House Charities Classic

|-
!colspan=9|

|-
!colspan=9| West Coast Conference tournament

|-
!colspan=10| 2010 NCAA Division I men's basketball tournament

|-

References

Gonzaga
Gonzaga Bulldogs men's basketball seasons
Gonzaga
Gonzaga Bulldogs men's basketball
Gonzaga Bulldogs men's basketball